National Primary Route 21, or just Route 21 (or ) is a National Road Route of Costa Rica, located in the Guanacaste, Puntarenas provinces.

Description
In Guanacaste province the route covers Liberia canton (Liberia, Nacascolo districts), Nicoya canton (Nicoya, Mansión districts), Santa Cruz canton (Santa Cruz, Diriá districts), Carrillo canton (Filadelfia, Palmira, Belén districts), Nandayure canton (Santa Rita, San Pablo districts).

In Puntarenas province the route covers Puntarenas canton (Lepanto, Paquera districts).

References

Highways in Costa Rica